Catherine Jacob may refer to:

Catherine Jacob (journalist) (born 1976), news correspondent for the British television network Sky News
Catherine Jacob (actress) (born 1956), French actress